Van Geel or van Geel is a Dutch toponymic surname. It means "of Geel" (a town in the province of Antwerp). It may refer to the following people:

Jacob van Geel (1585–1648), Dutch painter
Joost van Geel (1631–1698), Dutch painter
Marten Peeters van Geel (c. 1500–1566), Flemish painter and print publisher
Martin van Geel (born 1960), Dutch footballer (soccer player)
Pieter van Geel (born 1951), Dutch politician

Dutch-language surnames
Surnames of Dutch origin